A congruence θ of a join-semilattice S is monomial, if the θ-equivalence class of any element of S has a largest element. We say that θ is distributive, if it is a join, in the congruence lattice Con S of S, of monomial join-congruences of S.

The following definition originates in Schmidt's 1968 work and was subsequently adjusted by Wehrung.

Definition (weakly distributive homomorphisms). A homomorphism 
μ : S → T between join-semilattices S and T is weakly distributive, if for all a, b in S and all c in T such that μ(c) ≤ a ∨ b, there are elements x and y of S such that c ≤ x ∨ y, μ(x) ≤ a, and μ(y) ≤ b.

Examples:

(1) For an algebra B and a reduct A of B (that is, an algebra with same underlying set as B but whose set of operations is a subset of the one of B), the canonical  from Conc A to Conc B is weakly distributive.

(2) For a convex sublattice K of a lattice L, the canonical  from Conc K to Conc L is weakly distributive.

References 

E.T. Schmidt, Zur Charakterisierung der Kongruenzverbände der Verbände, Mat. Casopis Sloven. Akad. Vied. 18 (1968), 3--20.

F. Wehrung, A uniform refinement property for congruence lattices, Proc. Amer. Math. Soc. 127, no. 2 (1999), 363–370.

F. Wehrung, A solution to Dilworth's congruence lattice problem, preprint 2006.

Algebra